Wari Qalluni Pata (Aymara wari vicuña, qallu cattle with baby animals, -ni a suffix, pata step, 'a step with vicuñas and their babies', also  spelled Huari Kallunipata) is a  mountain in the Cordillera Real in the Andes of Bolivia. It is situated in the La Paz Department, Larecaja Province, Guanay Municipality, and in the Omasuyos Province, Achacachi Municipality, west of the mountain Ch'iyar Juqhu.

References 

Mountains of La Paz Department (Bolivia)